The Scheherazade Foundation CIC is a non-profit community interest company (CIC) established in 2020 to support cultural education and intercultural bridge-building. It is based in London, England.

Formation

The Scheherazade Foundation is a private, non-profit community interest company (CIC) established in 2020 by the writer and film-maker Tahir Shah and his daughter, Ariane Shah, to support cultural education and intercultural bridge-building. It is based in London, England. The company's registration number in the UK is 13038593.

The CIC is named after Scheherazade, the storyteller and main female character in the frame story of the collection of Middle Eastern tales,  One Thousand and One Nights.

Aims
The three main aims of The Scheherazade Foundation are:
 To seek to empower women – and in particular young women – who will step out into the world, becoming leaders and role models for future generations.
 To bridge cultures by striving towards shared values and know-how.
 To harness the teaching power of stories that has been a bedrock of the human experience since the dawn of civilization.

Headquarters in Casablanca 
In 2022, work began on renovating a one-acre, walled property, Dar Khalifa (The Caliph's House) in Casablanca to turn it into the headquarters of The Scheherazade Foundation.

According to Jason Webster in the Financial Times, Tahir Shah, who has previously written about his time in The Caliph's House, "hired artisans and craftsmen from across Morocco to work on fabulous zellij fountains, stucco screens with geometric Islamic designs, and intricately carved wooden Berber doorways."

Activities

Repatriation of Ethiopian artefacts 
In July 2021, The Scheherazade Foundation launched a crowdfunding appeal so that they could repatriate Ethiopian artefacts looted by British troops from Ethiopia in East Africa in 1868, following the Battle of Magdala. The crowdfunding enabled the foundation to purchase several items, including an imperial shield, handwritten Ethiopian religious texts, crosses, and a set of beakers, from a UK auction house and private dealers in Europe.

On 8 September 2021, the items were presented to the Ethiopian Ambassador, Teferi Melesse Desta by the foundation's chief executive officer, Tahir Shah, at a ceremony at London's Athenaeum Club. The embassy would then return the artefacts to the Ethiopian ministry of culture in the following weeks, the religious pieces being offered to the Ethiopian Orthodox Church and the rest most likely destined for the National Museum in the capital, Addis Ababa.

In a report in the Smithsonian Magazine, Dr. Alula Pankhurst, a member of Ethiopia's National Heritage Restitution Committee expressed hope that The Scheherazade Foundation's efforts would lead to further restitution initiatives, "especially at a time when retaining artefacts, notably human remains such as those of Prince Alemayehu in Windsor Chapel or sacred objects such as the holy Tabot Arks of the Covenant in the British Museum is becoming increasingly anachronistic, irrelevant and embarrassing."

The Scheherazade Foundation aims to repatriate more Ethiopian artefacts, and a reporter for Returning Heritage expressed the opinion that there is also a strong case "for returning the eleven sacred tabots, concealed within the vaults of the British Museum."

2021 letter of appeal
Several attempts have been made in the past to get the British Museum to repatriate artefacts in its possession, but the museum had argued that it "is forbidden by the British Museum Act of 1963 to restitute objects in its collection". However, a new legal opinion commission by the Scheherazade Foundation and drawn up by Samantha Knights QC points out that the 1963 Act "has a provision that allows disposal of objects 'unfit to be retained' and that can be disposed 'without detriment to the interests of students'", and that since the artefacts have been kept in the museum's vaults for the past 150 years, without allowing their study, copying or photography, the artefacts are of "no apparent use or relevance to the museum" and would therefore "fall within this category."

On the basis of this new legal opinion, a letter was drawn up by the Scheherazade Foundation and sent to the trustees of the British Museum asking for the return of the eleven wood and stone tabots held there. Signatories to the appeal include seven members of the House of Lords including former deputy chief whip Don Foster, Baron Foster of Bath; actor and broadcaster Stephen Fry; actor Rupert Everett; author and broadcaster Lemn Sissay; former British Ambassador to Ethiopia Sir Harold Walker, and retired Archbishop of Canterbury George Carey. In a statement about the appeal, the museum said that "These documents need to be reviewed and addressed with full consideration, and more time is required before this can be looked at by trustees."

Further developments 
In November 2021, Reuters confirmed that the artefacts acquired by The Scheherazade Foundation had been successfully returned to Ethiopia, and Ethiopia's tourism minister, Nasise Challa reported that, in addition, "we have started negotiations with the British Museum to bring back 12 tabots".

Scheherazade Foundation Publishing 
The Scheherazade Foundation is in the process of publishing a number of books on stories and storytelling:
* The Secrets of Scheherazade, Scheherazade Foundation Publishing, 2022, 
 Tale of a Lantern and Other Stories, Scheherazade Foundation Publishing, 2022, 
 The Elephant and The Tortoise and Other Stories, Scheherazade Foundation Publishing, 2022, 
 The Monkey’s Fiddle and Other Stories, Scheherazade Foundation Publishing, 2022, 
 Ghost of the Violet Well and Other Stories, Scheherazade Foundation Publishing, 2022, 
 Many Wise Fools and Other Stories, Scheherazade Foundation Publishing, 2022, 
 The Frog Prince and Other Stories, Scheherazade Foundation Publishing, 2022, 
 The Three Lemons and Other Stories, Scheherazade Foundation Publishing, 2022, 
 The Twelve-Headed Griffin and Other Stories, Scheherazade Foundation Publishing, 2022, 
 The Antelope Boy and Other Stories, Scheherazade Foundation Publishing, 2022, 
 The Purple Sapphire and Other Stories, Scheherazade Foundation Publishing, 2022, 
 The Treasure of A Thousand and One Nights, Scheherazade Foundation Publishing, 2022, 
 On Stories and Storytelling, Scheherazade Foundation Publishing, 2022, 
 On Storytelling, Scheherazade Foundation Publishing, 2022, 
 On Teaching Stories, Scheherazade Foundation Publishing, 2022, 
 On The Science of Storytelling, Scheherazade Foundation Publishing, 2022, 
 On A Thousand and One Nights, Scheherazade Foundation Publishing, 2022, 
 On Nasrudin, Scheherazade Foundation Publishing, 2022, 
 On Mythology, Scheherazade Foundation Publishing, 2022, 
 On Stories and Children, Scheherazade Foundation Publishing, 2022, 
 On Folklore, Scheherazade Foundation Publishing, 2022,

References

Further reading

External links
 The Scheherazade Foundation web site

Community interest companies
British companies established in 2020
Educational organisations based in London
Cultural education
Interculturalism